Avarett may refer to:

People with the surname
Thomas H. Averett, 19th century U.S. legislator

Institutions
Averett University, private college in Danville, Virginia, United States